TV3+ HD is a Danish high-definition television channel from Nordic Entertainment Group. The channel broadcasts high-definition simulcasts of TV3+, showing material available in HD in true HD, and upscaling the rest of the content.

The channel began broadcasting on 2 February 2010, and similar HD channels, TV3 HD and TV3 Puls HD, are expected.

Several sporting events are broadcast on the channel in HD, e.g. NFL, UEFA Champions League, Formula One and Danish Superliga.

External links 
Viasat

TV3+ HD
Television stations in Denmark
Television channels and stations established in 2010